The 1969–70 Washington State Cougars men's basketball team represented Washington State University for the 1969–70 NCAA college basketball season. Led by twelfth-year head coach Marv Harshman, the Cougars were members of the Pacific-8 Conference and played their home games on campus at Bohler Gymnasium in Pullman, Washington.

After dropping consecutive games to champion UCLA, the Cougars finished the season on a six-game winning streak. Their overall record was the best at Washington State since the national runner-up season  of 1940–41.

References

External links
Sports Reference – Washington State Cougars: 1969–70 basketball season

Washington State Cougars men's basketball seasons
Washington State Cougars
Washington State
Washington State